Christine Schwarz-Fuchs (née Schwarz; born 29 June 1974) is an Austrian politician from the Austrian People's Party.

She was elected President of the Federal Council on 1 January 2022.

References 

1974 births
Living people
Members of the Federal Council (Austria)
Presidents of the Austrian Federal Council

Austrian People's Party politicians
21st-century Austrian politicians
21st-century Austrian women politicians